Sergio Mena (born 17 April 2000) is a Colombian footballer.

Mena played for Rio Grande Valley FC during 2019, but the club did not extend his contract. Mean returned to Atlético Nacional, where he plays for the club's under-20 side.

References 

2000 births
Living people
Colombian footballers
Association football defenders
Rio Grande Valley FC Toros players
USL Championship players